The 1916 Cornell Big Red football team was an American football team that represented Cornell University during the 1916 college football season.  In their fifth season under head coach Albert Sharpe, the Big Red compiled a 6–2 record and outscored all opponents by a combined total of 165 to 73.  No Cornell players received honors on Walter Camp's 1916 College Football All-America Team. However, three players received All-America honors from other selectors: quarterback Fritz Shiverick (first team, United Press and Paul Purman); tackle Fred Gillies (first team, Fielding H. Yost); and end Paul Eckley (second team, Walter Eckersall).

Schedule

References

Cornell
Cornell Big Red football seasons
Cornell Big Red football